Hugues Dufourt is a French composer and philosopher associated with the spectral school of composition. Born in Lyon on September 28, 1943, Dufourt studied piano and composition at the Geneva Conservatory.

Dufourt became co-director of the Ensemble l'Itinéraire in 1973 and founded CRISS (Collectif de Recherche Instrumentale et de Synthèse Sonore—Instrumental and Sound Synthesis Research Collective) in 1977. It was for CRISS that he composed in 1978–79 his best-known work, Saturne, for percussion, wind ensemble, and electronics—a work inspired by Erwin Panofsky's analysis of etchings by Albrecht Dürer. His work Burning Bright (2014) also received five votes in a 2017 Classic Voice poll of the greatest works of art music by living composers since 2000.

Many of Dufourt's larger works have been inspired by the paintings of artists as various as Brueghel, Giorgione, Rembrandt, Poussin, Guardi, Goya, and Pollock.

References

Sources

External links
Biography, works, recordings, Editions Henry Lemoine
 

1943 births
Living people
Musicians from Lyon
Spectral music
Academic staff of the School for Advanced Studies in the Social Sciences
French classical composers
French male classical composers
20th-century French composers
21st-century French composers
20th-century classical composers
21st-century classical composers
French male conductors (music)
20th-century French conductors (music)
21st-century French conductors (music)
20th-century French musicologists
21st-century French musicologists
20th-century French male musicians
21st-century French male musicians
Chevaliers of the Légion d'honneur